Fred Sherman (born Clarence E. Kolegraff; May 14, 1905 – May 20, 1969) was an American actor.

Early years
Sherman was born Clarence E. Kolegraff in South Dakota.

Career 
After seeing his first stage show, he went to San Francisco and took a character part with an amateur stock company and acted in several touring companies.

His television credits included Perry Mason, I Love Lucy, Bonanza, The Adventures of Superman, and The Andy Griffith Show, on which he appeared in two episodes as dry cleaning store owner Fred Goss—he was featured as a beau of Aunt Bee in "Wedding Bells for Aunt Bee" and in "Jailbreak" in which he provided key information to help Andy and Barney capture two criminals.

His credited film roles included Too Many Women (1942); Shepherd of the Ozarks (1942); Hi, Neighbor (1942); *Wrecking Crew; Chain Lightning (1950); A Lust to Kill (1958); Alaska Passage (1959); and Why Must I Die? (1960).

Personal life and death 
After completing an episode of The Andy Griffith Show in 1962, he suffered a stroke which confined him to hospitals. Sherman died May 20, 1969, at the Motion Picture Country Hospital in Woodland Hills, Los Angeles, California.

On February 14, 1944, Sherman married actress Claire Carleton in Hollywood.

References

External links

1905 births
1969 deaths
Male actors from South Dakota
20th-century American male actors